Siripala Jayaweera was the sixth Governor of the North Western Province of Sri Lanka from January 1999 to April 2004.

References

Living people
Year of birth missing (living people)
Governors of North Western Province, Sri Lanka